Adrián Coria may refer to:

 Adrián Coria (football manager) (born 1959), Argentine football manager
 Adrián Coria (footballer) (born 1977), Argentine footballer